Himachal Pradesh Technical University, simply called HIMTU or HPTU, is a state university located in Hamirpur, Himachal Pradesh, India and established in 2011.

History
The establishment of HPTU was announced by the chief minister of Himachal Pradesh Prof. Prem Kumar Dhumal. Accordingly, the Himachal Pradesh Technical University (Established and Regulation) Act, 2010 (Act No. 16 of 2010 of Himachal Pradesh Legislative Assembly was assented by the Hon’ble Governor on 28 July 2010 and on 21 August 2010 the Act came into force.

On 7 January 2011 Prof.(Dr.) Shashi Kumar Dhiman took charge as the first Vice-Chancellor of Himachal Pradesh Technical University.

Colleges under Himachal Pradesh Technical University

External links
 

Universities in Himachal Pradesh
Education in Hamirpur district, Himachal Pradesh
2011  establishments in Himachal Pradesh
Educational institutions established in 2011